Sube y baja (aka Up and Down) is a 1959 Mexican comedy film directed by Miguel M. Delgado and starring Cantinflas, Teresa Velázquez, Domingo Soler, Carlos Agostí and Alejandro Ciangherotti. The film's art direction was by Gunther Gerszo.

Plot
Don Gaspar (Domingo Soler), the owner of a prestigious sporting goods store, decides to hire a man (Cantinflas) as a salesman in his store, after seeing him play an American football game.

When the man starts working in the store, he fails in many positions he is given, but Don Gaspar does not fire him despite the constant accusations of an employee of his who sees all the disasters he causes, and trusting that he is good for something. In the end, he degrades him to operator of the elevator, and later decides to send him to Acapulco to try to convince Jorge Maciel (Carlos Agostí), a famous professional athlete who will spend his vacation there, to sign an advertising contract that will give more prestige to Don Gaspar's company.

Cantinflas, when traveling to Acapulco with his compadre and registering at the hotel, is mistaken by accident with Jorge Maciel himself by a millionaire woman named Lucy (Teresa Velázquez), who is infatuated with him. After having won the affection of that woman he decides to maintain the falsehood despite knowing that the true Jorge Maciel will sooner or later arrive, so he has to compete in several sports categories, from which he wins all.

The real Jorge Maciel arrives at the hotel and finds out what the man is doing, and although he knows that he is usurping his identity, he decides not to unmask him because he wants to know who he is and what he wants. He stays with a false name and keeps an eye on the man all the time without being noticed.

In the end, Lucy, very much in love with the fake Jorge Maciel, proposes that they live together far away. Shortly afterwards, the real Jorge Maciel reveals himself to the man and asks for an explanation, he explains that he was initially sent to try to obtain his signature, but upon meeting Lucy and falling in love with her, he decided to impersonate him to maintain that love since he was unable to tell her the truth. Maciel promises not to tell her the truth and forgives him for everything. However, a companion of Lucy (Alejandro Ciangherotti) discovers it by hearing all of their conversation in secret.

The next morning, Lucy learns that the fake Jorge Maciel left the hotel at dawn without telling her anything, and her companion who discovered who he is offers to take her with him. The fake Jorge Maciel returns to the sporting goods store and Don Gaspar, very upset about failing the mission he entrusted to him, returns him to his elevator operator post to pay everything he spent on it; however, afterwards Jorge Maciel voluntarily goes to the store and presents himself to Don Gaspar to tells him that he will sign the document, only in return for the happiness of the person sent to achieve that purpose.

Lucy and her companion arrive at the sporting goods store, and seeing that her hero was nothing more than an elevator operator, she leaves very angry and disappointed. Just as the man is about to leave heartbroken, Don Gaspar appoints him general manager of the store for having won the contract with Jorge Maciel. In the end, the man, as general manager of the company, reconciles with Lucy.

Cast
Cantinflas as the fake Jorge Maciel
Teresa Velázquez as Lucy
Joaquín García Vargas as Compadre (as Joaquín García Vargas "Borolas")
Domingo Soler as Don Gaspar
Carlos Agostí as Jorge Maciel
Alejandro Ciangherotti as Lucy's companion
Georgina Barragán as Margarita, Lucy's sister
Luis Manuel Pelayo 
Mercedes Ruffino as Adelaida, Don Gaspar's wife (as Mercedes V. de Ruffino)
León Barroso
Eduardo Charpenel
Alberto Catalá
José Jasso
Armando Gutiérrez
Pedro Elviro (as Pedro Elviro "Pitouto")
José Luis Caro
Carlos León
Felipe de Flores
Carlos Robles Gil
Margarito Luna
Salvador Terroba
Roberto Meyer
Manuel Trejo Morales
Ricardo Adalid
Roy Fletcher
Lina Marín
Hermanas Benitez as Themselves
Ofelia Montesco as Woman in elevator (uncredited)

References

Bibliography
García Riera, Emilio. Historia documental del cine mexicano: 1958. Ediciones Era, 1975.
Lozoya, Jorge Alberto; Agrasánchez, Rogelio. Cine mexicano. Lunwerg Editores, 2006.

External links

1959 comedy films
1959 films
Mexican comedy films
Films directed by Miguel M. Delgado
1950s Spanish-language films
1950s Mexican films